Sean Clancy may refer to:

 Seán Clancy, member of the Irish Republican Army
 Seán Clancy (Irish general), Chief of Staff of the Irish Defence Forces
 Seán Clancy (composer), Irish composer and lecturer
 Sean Clancy (American football), American football linebacker
 Sean Clancy (fighter), Irish kickboxer
 Sean Clancy (footballer), English footballer
 Sean Clancy (musician), Award winning guitarist from New Zealand